Attorney General Reynolds may refer to:

John W. Reynolds Jr. (1921–2002), Attorney General of Wisconsin
John W. Reynolds Sr. (1876–1958), Attorney General of Wisconsin
Robert Reynolds (Attorney General) (1601–1678), Attorney General for England and Wales

See also
General Reynolds (disambiguation)